Dipterocarpus tuberculatus (Khmer khlông, Indian English gurjuntree) is a species of tree in the family Dipterocarpaceae found in Bangladesh, Myanmar, Thailand, Cambodia, Laos and Vietnam.

The lipids and wood are used in the Indian subcontinent. Uses in Cambodia include: using the leaves for packaging and sometimes for covering huts; the wood, resistant to bad weather, is used to make beams, boards and for the manufacture of boats; and the roots are used in traditional medicine to cure fractures. At least recently, the tree is an important firewood source in some areas of the Cambodian province of Kompong Chhnang.

References

tuperculatus
Flora of the Indian subcontinent
Flora of Indo-China